Sarah Evelyn Isobel Payne (13 October 1991 – c. 1 July 2000), was the victim of a high-profile abduction and murder in West Sussex, England in July 2000. 

Her disappearance and the subsequent investigation into her murder became a prominent case in the United Kingdom, as did the campaign for changes to child protection legislation that resulted from the murder. The murder investigation was also notable for the use of forensic evidence, which played a major role in securing a conviction.

Roy Whiting was convicted of abduction and murder in December 2001 and sentenced to life imprisonment.

Sarah Payne's disappearance
Sarah Payne, who lived in Hersham, Surrey, disappeared on the evening of 1 July 2000 from a cornfield near the home of her grandfather, Terence Payne and his second wife Lesley, in Kingston Gorse, West Sussex, England. Payne had been playing with her two brothers (aged 13 and 11 at the time) and younger sister (aged 5) when she disappeared. A police search of the local area commenced, and quickly transformed into a nationwide search and national news story, with members of the Payne family (mostly her parents Michael and Sara) making numerous television and newspaper appeals for her safe return.

On the evening of 2 July 2000, officers from Sussex Police first visited Roy Whiting at his seafront flat in Littlehampton as part of their inquiries into Sarah Payne's disappearance. A number of other suspects, particularly convicted sex offenders, were also questioned and at least one other person was arrested.

Police officers and numerous volunteers scoured the area around Littlehampton for clues to Sarah's disappearance, and her family made daily appeals on national television news for help in finding her. On 10 July, police announced that they had received information regarding the sighting of a girl who matched Sarah's description at Knutsford Services on the M6 motorway in Cheshire on the morning after her disappearance. Three days later, Michael and Sara Payne were warned by police to "prepare for the worst", explaining that the emphasis of their inquiries had shifted and that there was a possibility that their daughter might not be found safe and well.

The next day, Sussex Police confirmed that the body had been identified as that of Sarah Payne, and a murder investigation commenced.

Murder investigation
Roy Whiting was first questioned about the disappearance of Sarah Payne, which had taken place within  of his Littlehampton seafront flat, some 24 hours after she went missing. Whiting was routinely questioned as he was known to local police as a convicted sex offender. Police first visited Whiting's flat on the afternoon of 2 July 2000, but he was not there. The police returned that evening and questioned Whiting for over an hour before leaving. The officers left Whiting's flat but were suspicious of his apparent lack of concern for Sarah, which differed from the attitude of at least one other known sex offender who had already been questioned. When Whiting re-appeared soon afterwards and attempted to drive away in his van, he was stopped by the police and arrested. He spent two days in custody but the police had no concrete evidence to press any charges, although they had found a receipt for fuel at Buck Barn garage near Pulborough, which contradicted his alibi of being at a funfair in Hove at 5:30p.m. and then returning to his flat by 9:30p.m. on the night Sarah disappeared. Whiting was released on bail. Police had found a receipt for fuel from Buck Barn garage on the A24, not far from Coolham where one of Payne's shoes was found, contradicting his alibi. 

After his initial arrest, Whiting did not return to his Littlehampton flat and went to live with his father in Crawley.

On 20 July, three days after Sarah Payne's body was found, a shoe was recovered from a roadside in the village of Coolham, three miles from Pulborough, and identified as one of those belonging to Sarah Payne.

On 23 July 2000, Whiting stole a Vauxhall Nova in Crawley and was pursued by police at speeds of up to  before crashing into a parked vehicle. Whiting was arrested on a charge of dangerous driving. He was remanded in custody until 27 September 2000, when he admitted to the charges and was jailed for 22 months.

After Whiting began his jail term for the car theft and dangerous driving, detectives carried out forensic tests on his 1988 white Fiat Ducato van, which he had bought on 23 June 2000. 

On 6 February 2001, following seven months of investigating, Whiting was charged with the murder of Sarah Payne.

Trial
On 6 February 2001 Whiting appeared at Lewes Crown Court charged with abduction and murder. Whiting pleaded not guilty to both charges and was remanded in custody while still serving his sentence for the motoring offences, but the new charges against him prevented his release from prison during the summer of that year.

Whiting's trial began on 14 November 2001, at Lewes Crown Court. The jury heard from several witnesses. The key witnesses included Sarah Payne's oldest brother who had seen a 'scruffy-looking man with yellowish teeth' driving through Kingston Gorse on the evening that Sarah Payne went missing. Lee Payne did not pick out Whiting, however, when he was selected for an identity parade. One of Payne's shoes was found by a member of the public in a country lane and forensic tests had found fibres from Whiting's van on the shoe. This was the only item of Payne's clothing to be recovered. A strand of blonde hair on a T-shirt was found in Whiting's van. A DNA test established there was a one-in-a-billion chance of it belonging to anyone other than Payne. The jury also heard the testimony of two motorists who recalled a white van being parked at the roadside and pulling off a track on the evening of 1 July 2000, near the site where Payne's body was later found.

On 12 December 2001, after a four-week trial before Mr Justice Curtis and a jury, Whiting was convicted of the abduction and murder of Payne and he was sentenced to life imprisonment. The trial judge said it was a rare case in which a life sentence should mean life.

After Whiting was convicted, his previous convictions were revealed, which had been withheld from the jury and media. Police feared that any knowledge of his previous conviction could jeopardize the trial. In the event of being convicted, Whiting could argue that he had been tried on the evidence of an earlier crime, paving the way for an appeal and possible freedom. The fact that Whiting had now been exposed as a repeat offender sparked renewed calls for the government to allow controlled public access to the sex offender's register, although on the day after Whiting's conviction, the Home Office commented that such a system would be "unworkable," running the risk of driving paedophiles "underground", making it more difficult for the police to monitor and locate them, and putting them in danger of vigilante attacks.

This case is also notable for the extensive use of forensic science in establishing the prosecution case against Whiting. Twenty forensic experts from a variety of fields were employed during the inquiry, including entomology, palynology and environmental profiling, oil and lubricant analysis, pathology, geology, and archaeology. It has been estimated that the investigation involved 1,000 personnel and cost nearly £3million.

Sentencing
On 24 November 2002, Home Secretary David Blunkett ordered that Roy Whiting must serve a minimum of 50 years in prison. This made him ineligible for parole until 2051, when he would be at least 92 before parole could be considered. This was in effect an agreement with the trial judge's recommendation of a whole life tariff. Within 48 hours of the ruling being made, the Law Lords and the European Court of Human Rights had ruled in favour of another convicted murderer (Anthony Anderson) who was challenging the right of politicians to decide how long a murderer must spend in prison before being considered for parole.

In June 2004, the media reported that Whiting would apply to the Court of Appeal for a reduction of his 50-year minimum sentence. On 9 June 2010, Whiting's appeal resulted in a High Court Judge reducing his 50-year jail term by 10 years. Whiting's lawyers argued that the 50-year tariff, was politically motivated. The decision was also made at a time when the government was under fire from the public and media over a firefighters' strike. Mr Justice Simon said that under 2010 sentencing guidelines, Whiting might have received a whole life tariff. Whiting is now serving a 40-year minimum term, which will keep him in prison until at least 2041, when he will be 82. Payne's mother, Sara, was present and said she was "disappointed" by the decision and said that "life should mean life".

Roy Whiting

Roy William Whiting, the man found guilty of murdering Sarah Payne, was born in Horsham on 26 January 1959 and grew up in Crawley, where he lived for most of his life until he was convicted of the murder. He was one of six children born to George and Pamela Whiting, but three of his siblings died in infancy. He grew up in Langley Green, Crawley. In June 1986, he married Linda Booker. They separated before their son was born the following year and divorced in 1990. Whiting also fathered a daughter with another unnamed woman around 1990.

Whiting was involved in banger racing during his 20s and 30s, but eventually abandoned his interest in the sport due to a lack of success.

First conviction
On 4 March 1995, an eight-year-old girl was abducted and sexually assaulted in the Langley Green area of Crawley. Whiting was arrested several weeks later; a man who knew him came forward after hearing that the abductor's car was a red Ford Sierra, which matched the description of the car that Whiting had just sold. The vehicle was traced by police to its new owner and a knife was found hidden in it.

On 23 June 1995, Whiting admitted charges of abduction and indecent assault, and was sentenced to four years in prison. The maximum sentence for the crime was life imprisonment; however, he received a lesser sentence because he had admitted to the crime at an early opportunity, although a psychiatrist who assessed Whiting after his conviction said that he was likely to re-offend once he was released.

Whiting was released from prison in November 1997, having served 2 years and 5 months of his 4-year sentence, and was one of the first people in Britain to go on the sex offenders' register. He had been forced to serve an extra five months in prison before being released on licence as a penalty for refusing to participate in a sex offender rehabilitation program.

Minimum sentence
On 24 November 2002, it was announced that Home Secretary David Blunkett had imposed a 50-year minimum sentence on Whiting, which meant that he would not be released from prison until 2051 at the age of 92. 

Shortly afterwards, the High Court and European Court of Human Rights ruled in favour of another convicted murderer, Anthony Anderson, who was challenging the Home Secretary's right to decide whether a life sentence prisoner should be considered for parole.

In June 2004, the media reported that Whiting would appeal to the High Court for his sentence to be reduced. Whiting's appeal against the ruling was  heard on 9 June 2010 at the High Court, which now has the final say on when or if a life sentence prisoner can be considered for parole. Blunket's lawyers argued that his decision was politically motivated, as he had known for some time that he was likely to be stripped of his powers to decide on minimum terms for life sentence prisoners, that the government was under fire from the British public due to a firefighters strike, and that this would be an  opportunity of setting a 50-year tariff for Whiting. The move that would prove popular with voters due to the high profile of the crime and the fact that it was still relatively fresh in the public imagination. Shortly before the decision was announced, Myra Hindley had died; she had been the life sentence prisoner whose minimum sentence had been gradually increased from 25 years to a whole life tariff by a succession of Home Secretaries, causing Hindley and her supporters to claim that her sentence was being increased in a similar fashion as Whiting's.

The High Court reduced Whiting's minimum term to 40 years, bringing forward his parole date to 2041, making him eligible for parole at the age of 82.

Attacks in prison
On 4 August 2002, Whiting was attacked with a razor by another prisoner while fetching hot water at HMP Wakefield. In June 2004, convicted murderer Rickie Tregaskis was found guilty of carrying out the slashing that left Whiting with a six-inch scar on his right cheek.
Tregaskis, serving life for the murder of a disabled man in Cornwall, received a six-year sentence for the attack.

In July 2011, Whiting was again attacked in prison, and was stabbed in the eye. No charge was pressed by Whiting and consequently a police investigation into the assault was not undertaken. Whiting's injuries were not life-threatening.

A third attack on Whiting took place on 8 November 2018, when he was stabbed by two other prisoners in his cell at HMP Wakefield. He was taken to hospital for treatment but was returned to prison shortly after in a stable condition.

Aftermath

Sarah's Law

The campaign for Sarah's Law was spearheaded by the News of the World newspaper, and began in July 2000 in response to Payne's murder. This became the campaign for what is known as Sarah's Law, named after Megan's Law in the United States following a similar case several years earlier. Her parents backed the campaign as they were sure that their daughter's killer was a previously convicted child sex offender. Their belief was proved correct 17 months later when Roy Whiting was found guilty of the murder, and it was revealed that he already had a conviction for abducting and indecently assaulting an eight-year-old girl.

The aim of the campaign was for the government to allow controlled access to the sex offender registry, so parents with young children could know if a child sex offender lived in their area. Payne's mother has always insisted that such a law would have saved her daughter's life.

A modified scheme, whereby parents can enquire about a named individual who has regular access to their children, was introduced in four pilot areas of England and Wales in September 2008. In August 2010 the Home Office announced that, after proving successful, the Child Sex Offender Disclosure Scheme would be extended to cover the whole of England and Wales by spring 2011. This law allows parents to ask the police if somebody with regular access to their children has a record of sexual offenses.

Payne family
In 2004 the book Sara Payne: A Mother's Story, by Payne's mother Sara Payne, about her daughter's murder and the campaign for Sarah's Law, was published by Hodder & Stoughton.

In July 2001, it was reported that Payne's parents received £11,000 compensation from the Criminal Injuries Compensation Authority, an executive agency of the UK Government. Sara Payne described the offer as a "sick joke" and "derisory", even though it was the maximum CICA could offer by law. Media sources were also keen to criticise the payout and compare it to much higher payouts made in criminal and civil law for relatively minor injuries and work related stress.

Sara Payne was made a Member of the Order of the British Empire (MBE) in December 2008 for her work toward the passing of Sarah's Law. In December 2009, she suffered a life-threatening stroke and collapsed while at her home, but went on to make a good recovery.

In July 2011 it was revealed that Sara Payne had been among those targeted in the News International phone hacking scandal. Payne refused to believe it, since the News of the World had been so helpful in championing Sarah's Law. She even wrote an editorial in the newspaper's final edition. Investigators initially thought she was not hacked because her name did not come up in records. However, personal details relating to her were found that were attributed to another suspected victim. Sara's phone that was hacked was given to her by the News of the World's Rebekah Brooks, editor at the time of Sarah's murder. 

Sarah Payne's father, Michael, suffered from depression following the disappearance of his daughter. He separated from his wife of 18 years in August 2003, and subsequently became an alcoholic, leading to a 16-month jail term for attacking his brother with a glass in December 2011,  while intoxicated. On 30 October 2014, he was found dead at his home in Maidstone, Kent. Police reported there were no suspicious circumstances; he was believed to have died of an alcohol related illness several days before his body was found.

See also
List of kidnappings
Jessica's Law
Megan's Law
Clare's Law
Vishal Mehrotra – unsolved 1981 case of a child abducted from London and similarly found murdered in a rural area of West Sussex

References

External links
Argument rages over Sarah's law
Sarah's law explained

2000 in England
2000 murders in the United Kingdom
2000s in West Sussex
Arun District
Deaths by person in England
Female murder victims
Incidents of violence against girls
July 2000 events in the United Kingdom
July 2000 crimes
Murder in West Sussex
Murdered English children